Christ Crowned with Thorns is a c. 1550 painting by the Dutch painter Maarten van Heemskerck in the collection of the Frans Hals Museum, in Haarlem.

The subject depicts Christ before the crucifixion being mocked by soldiers, who are fixing the crown of thorns to his head. It was commissioned by the Church of Delft where it hung until 1625 when it was removed and placed in the town hall for being "too Catholic". It was sold 24 April 1860, when it was purchased by the noble Jhr. Jan Six of Hillegom. He in turn gave it to the museum in 1871.

Other versions of Christ crowned with thorns by Heemskerck are:

References

 De Doornenkroning on the museum website

1550s paintings
Heemskerck
Paintings by Maarten van Heemskerck
Collections in the Frans Hals Museum